Donald Bannerman Macleod (21 July 1887 – 8 March 1972) was a New Zealand molecular physicist.

Early life and education
Born at Doyleston, near Christchurch, in 1887, Macleod studied at Canterbury University College, graduating with an MA with first-class honours in chemistry in 1910.

Academic career
Following his graduation, Macleod was appointed as a lecturer in physics at Canterbury and worked there until his retirement in 1953 as an associate professor. He had a research collaboration with Professor Coleridge Farr from 1911 to 1936. In 1922 Macleod was awarded a DSc from Canterbury University College.

His work covered the viscosity of sulfur and the internal pressure of  liquids.

He was elected a Fellow of the Royal Society of New Zealand in 1935 and in 1940 he was awarded the society's Hector Medal for his work in the field of molecular physics.

Selected publications

References

1887 births
1972 deaths
People from Doyleston
University of Canterbury alumni
Academic staff of the University of Canterbury
Fellows of the Royal Society of New Zealand
New Zealand physicists
Thermodynamicists
20th-century New Zealand scientists